The 2007–08 All-Ireland Junior Club Hurling Championship was the fifth staging of the All-Ireland Junior Club Hurling Championship since its establishment by the Gaelic Athletic Association.

The All-Ireland final was played on 9 February 2008 at Croke Park in Dublin, between Conahy Shamrocks from Kilkenny and Moyle Rovers from Tipperary, in what was their first ever meeting in the final. Conahy Shamrocks won the match by 0-19 to 1-09 to claim their first ever All-Ireland title.

Munster Junior Club Hurling Championship

Munster quarter-finals

Munster semi-finals

Munster final

All-Ireland Junior Club Hurling Championship

All-Ireland quarter-final

All-Ireland semi-finals

All-Ireland final

References

All-Ireland Junior Club Hurling Championship
All-Ireland Junior Club Hurling Championship
All-Ireland Junior Club Hurling Championship